Enfield Chase is an area of Enfield that is named for a former royal hunting ground. It comprises the majority of the open countryside within the London Borough of Enfield, and land north of the M25 within Hertfordshire. At the time of a survey by Francis Russell in 1776-7, the Chase extended from Monken Hadley in the west to Bulls Cross in the east, and from Potters Bar to Southgate.  

While parts of the former area of the Chase including at Southgate, Oakwood, and Hadley Wood have been developed, areas that remain undeveloped include Trent Park, Whitewebbs Park, Hadley Common, Fir and Pond Wood near Potters Bar, and the valleys of the Salmons Brook, Turkey Brook, and Merryhills Brook, as well as golf courses at Hadley Wood and Whitewebbs. Remnants of the Chase now within the urban area of London include Chase Green near Enfield Town and Boxer's Lake Open Space in Oakwood.

Etymology
Enfield Chase was recorded as Enefeld Chacee in 1325 and chace of Enefelde in 1373, from the Middle English chace, meaning "a tract of ground for breeding and hunting wild animals".

History
Enfield Chase was part of this forest and also belonged to the citizens of London. 

By 1154 what had been known as the Park of Enfield or Enfield Wood had been converted into a hunting ground, or chase.  It appears it was not known as Enfield Chase until the early 14th century, by which time it was referred to as 'Parcus Extrinicus' (Latin, 'the Outer Park') to distinguish it from the older and smaller Enfield Old Park ('Parcus Intrinsicus' ('the Inner Park') which was mentioned in the Domesday Book as a park and was later used for rearing game to be released into the adjacent Chase.  

For hundreds of years the chase was owned at first by the Mandeville and then the de Bohun families while local inhabitants of Edmonton and Enfield manors claimed common rights. It is believed that Princess Elizabeth (later Queen Elizabeth I) often hunted on the Chase after she was granted the estate of West Lodge Park by her brother Edward VI in 1547.  In a charter of 1166-89 the hamlet of Southgate, sited around what is now Southgate Underground station, receives a mention.  It takes its name from its location at the South Gate of the old hunting ground, later known as Enfield Chase.

By the Act for the Division of Enfield Chase in 1777, the chase ceased to exist as an entity. According to the map accompanying the Act, the Chase was cut up and divided among the following authorities:

The Chase after the Division of 1777 

Based on the map entitled Survey and Admeasurement of Enfield Chase by Francis Russell in 1776/7, the Chase extended from Monken Hadley in the west to Bulls Cross in the east, and from Potters Bar to Southgate.

In 1777 George III leased the central part of the Chase to Sir Richard Jebb, his favourite doctor, as a reward for saving the life of the King's younger brother, the then Duke of Gloucester. This land later became Trent Park. 

The opening of Enfield station on the Great Northern line in 1871 (renamed Enfield Chase station in 1924 to avoid confusion with Enfield Town station) resulted in the first period of sustained housebuilding on former Chase lands. This began with 'artisan's cottages' built along Chase side in the 1880s and accelerated after the opening of new stations at Gordon Hill and Crews Hill in 1910. 

The grounds of South Lodge were acquired by developers Laing, who built a new housing estate in the period 1935-1939. Boxers Lake and Lakeside, once part of South Lodge, are the only remaining open spaces.  

In 1936-7 Middlesex County Council purchased around 4,000 hectares for inclusion in the Green Belt, which was drawn at the limits of urban development in 1939. Some of the land purchased became golf courses, whilst others, for example at Trent Park, Whitewebbs and Forty Hall, became public parks. The remainder of the Council-owned land was leased to tenant farmers.

The Enfield Chase Restoration Project 
The Chase was extensively deforested after the Act, and only a small amount of the original forest remains, although some areas have been replanted. In what is London’s largest reforestation project, Thames21 is working in partnership with Enfield Council to restore 60 hectares in the Salmons Brook catchment, part of the greater River Lea catchment.

Designation as an Area of Special Character

The Enfield Chase Heritage Area of Special Character (AoSC) was designated in 1994, following the recommendation of the Countryside Commission, English Nature, English Heritage and the London Ecology Unit, based on its combined landscape, historical and nature conservation interests. The AoSC is divided into a number of 'character areas' including the Salmons Brook Valley, the Turkey Brook Valley, the Merryhills Brook Valley, Clay Hill, the Theobalds Estate South, Whitewebbs and Forty Hall, Hornbeam Hills South (adjoining Hadley Wood) and Trent Park. The AoSC was designated in order to protect the existing character of Enfield Chase as an area comprising woodlands, streams, designed parklands and enclosed farmland.

The Enfield Development Management Policies Development Plan Document (a statutory planning document), adopted in 2014, states in policy DMD84 that "new development within the Areas of Special Character will only be permitted if features or characteristics which are key to maintaining the character of the area are preserved or enhanced."

See also
Francis Russell (died 1795)

References and sources
References

Sources
 Paine, M (2022) A History of Enfield Chase. The Enfield Society.
 Pam, D (1984) The Story of Enfield Chase. The Enfield Society. 
 Delvin, S. (1988) A History of Winchmore Hill. Hyperion Press. .
 Newby, Herbert W. (1949) "Old" Southgate. London: T. Grove.
 Williams, Sally (2011) Notes on the Lodges and Estates of Enfield Chase, London Parks and Gardens Trust

External links

https://pasttenseblog.wordpress.com/2016/07/09/today-in-london-rebel-history-poachers-battle-game%C2%ADkeepers-enfield-chase-1725/comment-page-1/

 
Areas of London
Districts of the London Borough of Enfield
Southgate, London
Middlesex